Flädie is a locality situated in Lomma Municipality, Skåne County, Sweden with 251 inhabitants in 2010.

References 

Populated places in Lomma Municipality
Populated places in Skåne County